Carleton-sur-Mer is the fifth largest town of the Gaspésie's south shore, in southeastern Quebec, Canada, located on Route 132, along Chaleur Bay. It is the seat of the Avignon Regional County Municipality.

The town's territory includes the communities of Biron, Caps-de-Maria, Carleton, Robitaille, and Saint-Omer.

History

Tracadigash/Carleton 

Around 1756, seven families of exiled Acadians arrived in Tracadigash from Bonaventure and Restigouche, following their deportation from Beaubassin, Nova-Scotia, in 1755. Charles Dugas and Benjamin LeBlanc (both from Grand Pré) were the original founders. In 1772, Abbé Joseph-Mathurin Bourg, first accredited Acadien priest, arrived from Quebec City. He conducted the very first census of Tragadigash (recensement Tracadigache 1777) where he listed the following family names: Allard, Allain, Arseneau, Aubertin, Barriot, Bergeron, Berthelot, Boudreau, Bujold, Comeau, Cormier, Dugas, Francis, Landry, Leblanc, Poirier, Richard; totalling 177 persons. A, later, three page correspondence to the governor, dated 7 April 1784, stated described land use "Endorsed: A list of the inhabitants of Tracadigache and the quantity of land each inhabitant has improved" which averaged 3 to 12 arpents per man.

In 1787, American Loyalists found their way to Tracadigash which eventually resulted in the parish changing its name from Saint-Joseph de Tracadièche (Tracadièche is the French spelling of Tragadigash) to Saint-Joseph de Carleton in honour of General Guy Carleton.

On October 4, 2000, the municipalities of Carleton and Saint-Omer were reunited after 100 years of separation and the new town thus formed was called Carleton–Saint-Omer. On May 7, 2005, the name was officially changed to Carleton-sur-Mer.

Saint-Omer 

After the arrival of the first Acadians in 1756, the territory of Saint-Omer was included in the Parish of Saint Joseph de Tracadièche and had a common history with Carleton. As more of the population shifted west, numbers eventually justified creating a new parish, and the Parish of Saint-Omer was finally approved by the government in 1902.

For 100 years, Saint-Omer functioned as a distinct parish and municipality. Its economy depended largely on fishing, agriculture and forestry. Saint-Omer had its own elementary schools, but its teenagers attended Carleton's École Polyvalente (renamed École Antoine-Bernard in 1983).

On October 4, 2000, the municipalities of Saint-Omer and Carleton were united to form Carleton-Saint-Omer.

Saint-Louis de Gonzague, Founded since 1864 
The small agricultural and forestry village of Saint-Louis de Gonzague, 8 kilometers north of Saint-Omer, was established by the Government of Quebec to encourage economic development. The Biron section was shut down by the Quebec government in 1972. Five people remained residents of the village to work the land. In 2002, the Gaspé union paysanne held its yearly Fête de l'union paysanne gaspésienne there.

Demographics 

Mother tongue:
 English as first language: 1.2%
 French as first language: 97.2%
 English and French as first language: 1%
 Other as first language: 0.5%

Economy 
Carleton's economy relied historically mostly on agriculture, fishing and forest products. The deep water wharf allowed for large international vessels to load lumber. Tourism was, from the very beginnings, a significant aspect of the economy due in large part to its beaches and warm water temperature.

The Carleton Wind Farm was commissioned in 2008 and is contributing electricity to Hydro-Québec's grid.

Culture 
 The École Antoine Bernard high school and its students were the subject of the 2014 documentary film, Guidelines.
 The bilingual singer/songwriter Kevin Parent went to high school here at École Antoine-Bernard
 TVA affiliate CHAU-DT

Government
The current mayor of Carleton-sur-Mer is Mathieu Lapointe. The mayor and a six-member city council are the elected officials of the municipality.

As of 2021 the council consists of:

 Mayor: Mathieu Lapointe
 Councillors: 
 1: Régis Leblanc
 2: Esteban Figueroa
 3: Jean-Simon Landry
 4: Alain Turcotte
 5: Sylvie Tremblay
 6: Denise Leblanc

Education 
 Commission scolaire René-Lévesque (used to be Commission scolaire Tracadièche, from the Mi'kma  "Place of many herons")
 Elementary schools: École Bourg, École des Audomarois
 High school: École Antoine-Bernard de Carleton
 College: Centre d'études collégiales de Carleton (Collège de la Gaspésie et des Îles)
 Continuing education: Groupe Collégia
 University: Université du Québec à Rimouski

Historical 
 École St-Joseph Grades 1-3 Ceased operation as a primary school in about 2000; demolition planned for 2015.
 École Normale Grades 3-4  (building now houses college/university offices)
 Kindergarten (1965–1978) Now demolished small building located behind École Bourg

Sports 
 Figure skating club Les Myriades de Carleton
 Nautical Club of Carleton inc.
 Mont Carleton snowmobile club
 Carleton-sur-mer kayak rentals
 18-hole golf course and golf association
 Minor hockey association
 Adult softball league
 Bowling alley
 Health club Carleton-Gest Mag

See also
 List of cities in Quebec

References

Sources 
Répertoire des municipalités du Québec
Commission de toponymie du Québec
Affaires municipales et régions - cartes régionales
 MARTIN, Paul-Louis (1944-) ; ROUSSEAU, Gilles
La Mémoire du Québec en ligne: dictionnaire des noms propres du Québec

External links 

 Carleton-sur-Mer on Info Gaspésie
  Municipalities and cities of Gaspé region

 
Cities and towns in Quebec